Phillip Forsyth was a Canadian newspaper and radio journalist, who was co-host of As It Happens, with Harry Brown and William Ronald, from 1968 to 1969. Previous to his hosting As It Happens, he was an editor for the Canadian Press, a staff writer with the Toronto Star and then a freelance broadcast journalist.

References

Canadian talk radio hosts
Year of birth missing (living people)
Living people